The Anglican Church of the Resurrection is a church located in central Bucharest, Romania, near Grădina Icoanei, at the intersection of Xenopol street and Arthur Verona street. The church is a red brick building and services are held in English on Sundays between 10 and 11 AM.

History
The land on which the church was built was given by the Commune of Bucharest to the British Crown in December 1900. The outside of the building was completed in 1914, but the interiors (with furnishings from England) were finished only after World War I. The first service was held in 1920, and the church was dedicated on November 5, 1922 by the Bishop of Gibraltar.

During World War II, the church was closed and maintained by a church guardian and cleaner who was paid by the Swiss Embassy. It was reopened only on Christmas Day 1944 with the help of the Royal Navy and American military staff. After the Communists seized power in Romania, there was no permanent chaplain, services being held by visiting priests on a monthly basis. Starting in 1966, the church once again had a permanent priest. The current chaplain is Rev. Dr. Nevsky Everett.

References

External links

Anglican church buildings in Romania
Churches in Bucharest
Historic monuments in Bucharest
Churches completed in 1914
Diocese in Europe